The Cururuaçu River is a river in the Pará state of north-central Brazil. It is a tributary of the Teles Pires.

See also
List of rivers of Pará

References
Brazilian Ministry of Transport

Rivers of Pará